Kalathu Veedu  (The War House) is a 2015 Indian-Tamil soap opera that  aired Monday through Friday on Vijay TV from 2 November 2015 to 25 March 2016 at 6:30PM IST for 102 episodes. The show starred Shankara Pandian, Devi Priya, Sivan Srinivasan, Anila, Manickam, Rajesh, Gayathri and directed by Arul Raj.

Plot
The Kalathu Veedu family, of the village head Sivan Kaalai is a renowned and influential family of a village near Madurai, Ponraasu, the head of the Kaara Veedu is jealous of Sivankaalai and wants to defame him at any cost.

Panchavarnam, the head of the Karma Veedu whose father was punished for stealing, by Sivan Kaalai's father, also seeks to destroy the Kalathu Veedu family. Thus, with a joint plan, the duo join hands to defame and break the Kalathu Veedu. Their efforts bear fruit, and the family is broken and shattered.

But on his death bed, the Kalathu Veedu head, Sivankaalai, calls his youngest son Jeeva, who is a filmmaker now, to reunite the family and bring back the fame and glory of the Kalathu Veedu. How Jeeva overcomes obstacles to achieve these goals and make his father's last wish come true, is the story.

Cast

 Shankara Pandian
 Devi Priya Dindigul (Salangai Oli Nattiyakkulu Team)
 Sivan Srinivasan
 Anila
 Manickam
 Rajesh
 Gayathri
 Hema Rajkumar
 Manoharan
 Balan
 Jeethu
 Perumayi
 Reema
 Sampath
 Shanthi
 Jayaprakash
 Prabhu Kodikkulam
 Kannan
 Karthi Madurai

References

External links
Official Website on hotstar

Star Vijay original programming
Tamil-language romance television series
2015 Tamil-language television series debuts
Tamil-language television shows
2016 Tamil-language television series endings